In Uganda the most spoken local language is Luganda, followed by English (also the official language since 1962), as all schools in Uganda use it in their studies due to the introduction of English during the colonial period. English is also the language of business and judicial matters. Most spoken after Luganda and English is Swahili. This language is more common in neighbouring Kenya and Tanzania. Swahili is taught in schools as an optional additional language and it is mostly spoken by the Ugandan army. In 2005, there were talks to include Swahili into as the second official language as it was seen as neutral, however this is still not ratified by the government.

Uganda is a multilingual country with over 70 generally estimated languages spoken. 43 of its living languages fall into four main families—Bantu, Nilotic and Central Sudanic and Kuliak. Of these, 41 are indigenous and 2 are non-indigenous. Furthermore, 5 are institutional, 27 are developing, 7 are established, 2 are endangered, and 2 are almost extinct. There is also a Ugandan Sign Language.

Languages 

In all of the Bantu speaking areas of Uganda, dialect continua are very common. For example, people around central Uganda speak Luganda and people in western Uganda speak ruTooro, ruNankore among others.

Nilotic languages include Karamojong of eastern Uganda (population 370,000), the Kakwa language in the extreme northwestern corner (about 150,000 population) and Teso south of Lake Kyoga (3.2 million 9.6% of Uganda's population). Western Nilotic Luo languages include Alur (population 459,000), Acholi, Lango, Adhola and Kuman of eastern Uganda. (Acholi and Lango are interintelligible, and sometimes the term "Luo" is used to cover them.)

Some Southern Nilotic  Kalenjin languages are spoken along the border with Kenya, including Pökoot and the Elgon languages near Kupsabiny. Kuliak languages Ik and Soo are spoken in northeast Uganda. Lugbara, Aringa, Ma'di and Ndo of northwestern Uganda are members of the Central Sudanic languages.

Language policy
In Uganda, as in many African countries, English was introduced in government and public life by way of missionary work and the educational system. During the first decades of the twentieth century, Swahili gained influence as it was not only used in the army and the police, but was also taught in schools.

After independence, there were efforts to choose an African official language, with Swahili and Luganda as the most considered candidates. Although Luganda was the most geographically spread language, people outside Buganda were opposed to having it as a national language. English remained the official language.

Ugandan English, a local dialect of English, is largely influenced by native languages of the Ugandan people but very similar to British and American English.

Uganda National Kiswahili Council 
In 2011, government of Uganda revealed plans to establish a Swahili language council to boost the teaching of the Swahili language in the country. It was not until September 9, 2019 that the cabinet passed resolution to create the National Kiswahili Council.

The National Swahili Council is meant to guide the planning process, implementation of interventions and allocation of resources to the usage and development of kiSwahili as a lingua franca-a language that is adopted as a common language between speakers whose first languages are different.

References

Further reading
Gordon, Raymond G., Jr. (ed.), 2005. Ethnologue: Languages of the World, Fifteenth edition. Dallas, Tex.: SIL International. Online version: http://www.ethnologue.com/. More specifically  Ethnologue report for Uganda, retrieved August 19, 2005.
 Ladefoged, Peter; Ruth Glick; Clive Criper; Clifford H. Prator; Livingstone Walusimbi (1972) Language in Uganda (Ford Foundation language surveys vol. 1). London/New York etc. Oxford University Press. 
 Mpuga, Douglas (2003) 'The official language issue: A look at the Uganda Experience'. Unpublished paper presented at the African Language Research Project Summer Conference, Maryland.
 Parry, Kate (ed.) (2000) Language and literacy in Uganda: towards a sustainable reading culture. Kampala: Fountain Publishers.